Cumbria County Cricket Club was established on 10 April 1946 as the Cumberland and Westmorland County Cricket Club, though the Westmorland was dropped from the name shortly thereafter. The club changed its name to Cumbria County Cricket Club in 2021. It has since played minor counties cricket from 1955 and played List A cricket from 1984 to 2003, using a different number of home grounds during that time. Their first minor counties fixture in 1955 was against the Yorkshire Second XI at Edenside, Carlisle, while their first List A match came 29 years later against Derbyshire in the 1984 NatWest Trophy at Parkside Road, Kendal.

The sixteen grounds that Cumbria have used for home matches since 1955 are listed below, with statistics complete through to the end of the 2014 season.

Grounds

List A
Below is a complete list of grounds used by Cumberland County Cricket Club when it was permitted to play List A matches. These grounds have also held Minor Counties Championship and MCCA Knockout Trophy matches.

Minor Counties
Below is a complete list of grounds used by the Cumberland County Cricket Club in Minor Counties Championship and MCCA Knockout Trophy matches.

Notes

References

Cumbria County Cricket Club
Cricket grounds in Cumbria
Cumberland